Rivals is a 2008 French action film directed by Jacques Maillot.

Cast 
 Guillaume Canet as François
 François Cluzet as Gabriel
 Clotilde Hesme as Corinne
 Marie Denarnaud as Nathalie
 Mehdi Nebbou as José Lazaga
 Olivier Perrier as Henri
 Carole Franck as Monique

References

External links 

2008 action films
2008 films
Films set in Lyon
French action films
2000s French films